XHUACS-FM is a radio station serving Saltillo owned by the Universidad Autónoma de Coahuila. It is branded as Radio Universidad and broadcasts on 104.1 FM from its campus.

The station came to air on May 8, 2013.

It shares programming with XHUCT-FM 89.5 in Torreón, which is the other radio station operated by the university.

References

Radio stations in Coahuila
Mass media in Saltillo
University radio stations in Mexico